The Guía Narrows (Spanish Angostura Guías) are located between Chile's Hanover and Chatham Islands. Guia Narrows connects Sarmiento and Inocentes Channels. The narrows are 6 miles long
and are 1 to 1.5 miles wide, except at the north end, between Porpoise Point, low and sharp, on the west side, and Guard Island on the east, where the breadth is about 400 yards, but generally, there is no danger; the shores being steep-to on either side. Sometimes, the tide sweeps strongly around the point; therefore, it would be advisable to keep closer to Guard Island while passing through.

References
 United States Hydrographic Office, South America Pilot (1916) p. 410

Straits of Chile
Bodies of water of Magallanes Region